Diporodemus is a genus of land planarians found in the Americas.

Description 
The genus Diporodemus is characterized by the copulatory apparatus having a large seminal bursa (or bursa copulatrix) connected to the vagina by a canal, called Beauchamp's canal. This bursa also opens to the exterior by a canal and a pore situated behind the common gonopore.

Species 
Currently, there are 5 species assigned to the genus Diporodemus:
Diporodemus hymanae E. M. Froehlich & Froehlich, 1972
Diporodemus indigenus Hyman, 1943
Diporodemus merridithae Glasgow, 2013
Diporodemus plenus Hyman, 1941
Diporodemus yucatani Hyman, 1938

References 

Geoplanidae
Rhabditophora genera